Navayugom is a Malayalam fortnightly published in Kerala, India. It is the official organ of the Kerala State Council of the Communist Party of India. Navayugam started publishing on 7 January 1950, as Weekly.  K. Damodaran was the first editor.

References 

Communist Party of India
Communist newspapers
Malayalam-language newspapers
Daily newspapers published in India
Publications established in 1950
1950 establishments in India
Communist periodicals published in India